The 1952–53 Hong Kong First Division League season was the 42nd since its establishment.

League table

References
1952–53 Hong Kong First Division table (RSSSF)

Hong Kong First Division League seasons
Hong
football